The Segunda Esquadra is the main police station of Bissau, the capital city of Guinea-Bissau.

Conditions
On 7 October 2008 several human rights violations were verified by the United Nations Peacebuilding Support Office in Guinea-Bissau. They consisted of inadequate facilities and lack of minimum living standards; lack of water and food. Several recommendations were made, these included: the adoption of mechanisms for the provision of water and food and the closure of underground detention cells.

Notable detainees
 Marcelino Lopes Cabral, former Defence Minister.
 Zinha Vaz, member of the National People's Assembly.

References

Police stations
Buildings and structures in Bissau